The following is an episode list for the anime adaptation of the Da Capo II series of games, including Da Capo II: Second Season. The Da Capo II anime first season, animated by Feel (who animated Da Capo: Second Season), originally aired from 1 October to 24 December 2007 on the Japanese networks Chiba TV, Sun TV, and TV Aichi. As it was a general-audience anime, the explicit scenes of the original game were likewise omitted. The second season Da Capo II: Second Season, produced by Feel, originally aired between 5 April 2008 and 28 June 2008.

Summary of series

Da Capo II

Da Capo II: Second Season

References

Episodes
Da Capo II